Ardatov is an urban locality (a work settlement) and the administrative center of Ardatovsky District of Nizhny Novgorod Oblast, Russia, located on the Lemet River (Oka's basin),  southwest of Nizhny Novgorod. Population:

References

Urban-type settlements in Nizhny Novgorod Oblast
Ardatovsky District, Nizhny Novgorod Oblast
Ardatovsky Uyezd (Nizhny Novgorod Governorate)